Young Communist League of Estonia was the youth wing of the Communist Party of Estonia during the interbellum period.

Activities and organization 
EKNÜ was working in a clandestine manner. It published Noor Proletaarlane (1921) and Noor Tööline (1922–1923). There are other publications from the EKNÜ that were written by Kalju Tiro. EKNÜ was a section of the Communist Youth International. After the incorporation of Estonia into the Soviet Union on 6 August 1940, EKNÜ merged into the All-Union Leninist Young Communist League (VLKSM). The Estonian branch of VLKSM had the name 'Leninist Young Communist League of Estonia' (Eestimaa Leninlik Kommunistlik Noorsooühing, ELKNÜ).

References

Sources
 Parming, Tönu. The Electoral Achievements of the Communist Party, 1920-1940. Slavic Review, Vol. 42, No. 3. (Autumn, 1983), pp. 426–447.

Youth wings of communist parties
Youth wings of political parties in Estonia
Political history of Estonia
Komsomol
1920 establishments in Estonia
1940s disestablishments in Estonia
Estonian Soviet Socialist Republic
Youth organizations established in 1920